The 1937–38 National Football League was the 11th staging of the National Football League (NFL), an annual Gaelic football tournament for the Gaelic Athletic Association county teams of Ireland.

Mayo won the league for the fifth year in a row, beating Meath in the final. This season was notable for featuring the first commentary by Mícheál Ó hEithir, who, along with four others, did a test commentary on Dublin v. Louth in May 1938. Dr Kiernan was so impressed by Ó hEithir's performance that he allowed him to commentate on the entire second half. ɗ

Format 

There were two divisions – Division 1 and Division 2.

Division 1 was split into two Groups. Group winners played off for the NFL title.

Results and tables

Division 1

Group A

Group A play-off

Group B

 Mayo deducted 2 points for fielding a suspended player

Group B play-offs

Division 1 Final

Division 2

Teams in Division 2 were Wicklow, Carlow, Cork, Waterford, Tipperary

References

National Football League
National Football League
National Football League (Ireland) seasons